The Women's 400m Individual Medley event at the 11th FINA World Aquatics Championships swam on 31 July 2005 in Montreal, Canada.

At the start of the event, the existing World (WR) and Championships (CR) records were:
WR: 4:33.59 swum by Yana Klochkova (Ukraine) on 16 September 2000 in Sydney, Australia
CR: 4:36.10 swum by Petra Schneider (Ukraine) on 1 August 1982 in Guayaquil, Ecuador

Results

Final

Preliminaries

References

Swimming at the 2005 World Aquatics Championships
2005 in women's swimming